The 1993 FIFA World Youth Championship, known as the 1993 FIFA/Coca-Cola World Youth Championship for sponsorship purposes, was the 9th edition FIFA World Youth Championship. U20 Brazil defeated Ghana, 2–1 for its third title. It took place across five cities in Australia. The tournament was originally to be held in Yugoslavia, but due to the Yugoslav Wars, was moved to Australia.

Venues

Qualification
For the first time ever, Russia competed after the dissolution of Soviet Union. It was also the first time Germany played after the reunification. However, as they are designated as descendant of East Germany and West Germany respectively, they are not considered as tournament debutants.

1.Teams that made their debut.
2.Germany made their debut as a unified nation. They were chosen as the descendant of the now-defunct West Germany, which qualified in 1981 and 1987 tournaments. The now-defunct East Germany qualified in 1987 and 1989 tournaments.
3.Russia made their debut as independent nation. They were chosen as the descendant of the now-defunct Soviet Union, which qualified in 1977, 1979, 1983, 1985, 1989, and 1991 tournaments.

Squads

Group stage
The 16 teams were split into four groups of four teams. Four group winners, and four second-place finishers qualify for the knockout round.

Group A

Group B

Group C

Group D

Knockout stage

Quarter-finals

Semi-finals

Third place play-off

Final

Result

Awards

Goalscorers

Henry Zambrano of Colombia won the Golden Shoe award for scoring three goals. In total, 82 goals were scored by 56 different players, with two of them credited as own goals.

3 goals

 Ante Milicic
 Gian
 Adriano
 Henry Zambrano
 Augustine Ahinful
 Vicente Nieto
 Chris Faklaris

2 goals

 Paul Agostino
 Julian Joachim
 André Breitenreiter
 Carsten Jancker
 Emmanuel Duah
 Luis Salazar
 Aleksandr Karatayev
 Lee Ki-hyung
 Miles Joseph
 Fabián O'Neill
 Fernando Correa

1 goal

 Anthony Carbone
 Kevin Muscat
 Bruno Carvalho
 Catê
 Marcelinho Paulista
 Yan Razera
 Bernard Tchoutang
 David Embé
 Marc-Vivien Foé
 Pius Ndiefi
 Arley Betancourth
 Oscar Restrepo
 Chris Bart-Williams
 David Unsworth
 Ian Pearce
 Jamie Pollock
 Charles Akonnor
 Daniel Addo
 Isaac Asare
 Mohammed Gargo
 Nii Lamptey
 Samuel Kuffour
 Jesús Olalde
 Bambo
 Aleksei Savchenko
 Dmitri Ananko
 Igor Zazulin
 Sergei Chudin
 Abdullah Al Takrouni
 Cho Jin-ho
 Serkan Reçber
 Brian Kelly
 Imad Baba
 Kerry Zavagnin
 Diego López
 Sergio Sena Lamela

Own goal
 Steve Watson (playing against South Korea)
 Murad Magomedov (playing against Australia)

Final ranking

External links
FIFA World Youth Championship Australia 1993 , FIFA.com
RSSSF > FIFA World Youth Championship > 1993
FIFA Technical Report (Part 1), (Part 2), (Part 3) and (Part 4)

Fifa World Youth Championship, 1993
FIFA World Youth Championship
International association football competitions hosted by Australia
F
March 1993 sports events in Australia